is an upcoming professional wrestling event promoted by CyberFight's DDT Pro-Wrestling (DDT). It will take place on March 21, 2023, in Tokyo, Japan, at the Korakuen Hall. It is the twenty-seventh event under the Judgement name and the eleventh to take place at the Korakuen Hall. The event will air domestically on Fighting TV Samurai and globally on CyberFight's video-on-demand service Wrestle Universe.

Production

Background
Judgement is an event held annually around March by DDT Pro-Wrestling since 1997. It has been marking the anniversary of the promotion since the very first official event produced by DDT on March 25, 1997. Over the years, Judgement would become the biggest show of the year until 2009 when Peter Pan became the flagship event series.

Storylines
Judgement 2023 will feature 16 professional wrestling matches that involved different wrestlers from pre-existing scripted feuds and storylines. Wrestlers portrayed villains, heroes, or less distinguishable characters in the scripted events that built tension and culminate in a wrestling match or series of matches.

On February 26, at Into The Fight, Yukio Naya defeated Harashima to become the #1 contender to Yuji Hino's KO-D Openweight Championship.

Matches

References

External links
The official DDT Pro-Wrestling website

DDT Pro-Wrestling
2023
2023 in professional wrestling
Professional wrestling in Tokyo
Professional wrestling anniversary shows
March 2023 events in Japan